State Route 665 (SR 665) is an east–west state highway located in central Ohio, a U.S. state. The western terminus of this state highway is at a signalized intersection that marks the confluence of US 42, SR 38, SR 56 and SR 142 in downtown London.

Route description
SR 665 passes through the eastern portion of Madison County and the southwestern corner of Franklin County.  There is no segment of this route that is included within the National Highway System, a system of highways deemed most important for the nation's economy, mobility and defense.

History
When it was first designated in 1937, SR 665 was routed along its present alignment between the junction of US 42, SR 38, SR 56, and SR 142 in London and US 23 near Lockbourne.  Just two years later, the highway was extended on the east end, via a short jog northerly along US 23, then east along what is today SR 317 from US 23 into Groveport, where the route came to an end at the Main Street intersection.  Then, in 1973, a southward extension of SR 317 through the eastern portion of suburban Columbus resulted in that highway being extended to Groveport.  SR 317 was linked in with what was then the eastern terminus of SR 665, and then replaced SR 665 from that point westerly to US 23.  Consequently, SR 665 was restored to its original routing, and has not changed since that time. As of 2013, SR 317's southern terminus has been realigned to end at SR 665's eastern terminus.

Major intersections

References

External links

State Route 665 Endpoint Photos

665
Transportation in Madison County, Ohio
Transportation in Franklin County, Ohio